Amphasia is a genus of beetles in the family Carabidae, containing the following species:

 Amphasia interstitialis (Say, 1823)
 Amphasia sericea (T.W. Harris, 1828)

References

Harpalinae